Mansourou Adolphe Aremou (born 16 April 1952) is a Beninese assistant professor and sports administrator. He was assistant professor at the National University of Benin from 1987 to 2009. Alongside his teaching activities, he held executive positions in the world of handball. He is the current President of African Handball Confederation (CAHB) since September 2008. He also holds the position of vice-president in the International Handball Federation since 2008.

References

1952 births
Living people
African Handball Confederation
Beninese sports executives and administrators
University of Bordeaux alumni
People from Cotonou